Grubber is a term which was sometimes used in Victorian England to describe people who scavenged in drains for a living.

Grubber is also a colloquial name used in New Zealand for a mattock and in Australia as a term for a cricket ball which when bowled (as a result of lack of force) results in the ball either not bouncing enough to be hit by the batter, or failing to bounce at all.

See also
 Junk man
 Tosher – someone who scavenges in sewers
 Mudlark
 Waste picker
 Magnet fishing

Further reading
Cultural Anthropology: Tribes, States, and the Global System By John H. Bodley  Published by Altamira Press
London labour and the London poor:  Volume 2 , By Henry Mayhew

Obsolete occupations